Cedar Ridge  is an unincorporated community in Nevada County, California, United States, along State Route 174  east/southeast of  Grass Valley, California. and approximately  east/southeast of the Empire Mine in Gold Country.  The first Post Office was established in 1948 and the zip code is 95924.

Geography 
Cedar Ridge is located at (39.199, -121.021).

References

External links
 Photos

Unincorporated communities in California
Unincorporated communities in Nevada County, California